Anna Paulson may refer to:
 Anna Paulson (footballer)
 Anna Paulson (economist)

See also
 Anna Paulsen, Norwegian actress